Pedro Eugenio de Felipe Cortés (18 July 1944 – 12 April 2016) was a Spanish footballer who played as a central defender.

Club career
Born in Madrid, de Felipe returned to Real Madrid in 1964 at the age of 20 following a loan to Community of Madrid neighbours Rayo Vallecano. He appeared in only four La Liga games in his first season but totalled 45 the following two, winning the 1965–66 European Cup in the process while contributing seven complete matches.

On 28 September 1967, after playing three games with a damaged meniscus, de Felipe successfully underwent surgery, being out of action for several months. He still managed to be regularly used during two of his last four years at the Santiago Bernabéu Stadium, leaving the club in 1972 and spending a further six top-flight campaigns with RCD Español, retiring at 34.

A tough tackler – sometimes to excess– de Felipe severely injured FC Barcelona's Miguel Ángel Bustillo on 14 September 1969, in a 3–3 home draw. The scorer of two early goals, Bustillo was able to take part in just three league matches for the Camp Nou-based side in as many seasons.

International career
De Felipe earned one cap for Spain, playing the full 90 minutes in a 0–0 friendly draw with Turkey on 17 October 1973, in Istanbul.

Death
De Felipe died on 12 April 2016 in Madrid, due to cancer. He was 71 years old.

Honours
Real Madrid
La Liga: 1964–65, 1966–67, 1967–68, 1968–69, 1971–72
Copa del Generalísimo: 1969–70; Runner-up 1967–68
European Cup: 1965–66

References

External links

1944 births
2016 deaths
Spanish footballers
Footballers from Madrid
Association football defenders
La Liga players
Tercera División players
Rayo Vallecano players
Real Madrid CF players
RCD Espanyol footballers
UEFA Champions League winning players
Spain amateur international footballers
Spain international footballers